The Grafton Post Office in Grafton, North Dakota, United States, is a Colonial Revival building completed in 1932.  It was listed on  the National Register of Historic Places as U.S. Post Office-Grafton in 1989.

References

Colonial Revival architecture in North Dakota
Government buildings completed in 1932
Post office buildings on the National Register of Historic Places in North Dakota
National Register of Historic Places in Walsh County, North Dakota
1932 establishments in North Dakota
Post Office